Vanna Bounlovongsa (born 21 November 1998), is a Laotian footballer currently playing as a defender.

Career statistics

International

References

1998 births
Living people
Laotian footballers
Laos international footballers
Association football defenders
Competitors at the 2019 Southeast Asian Games
Southeast Asian Games competitors for Laos